The 2016–17 I-League was the 10th season of the I-League, the top Indian professional league for association football clubs, since its establishment in 2007. The season began on 7 January 2017 and concluded on 30 April 2017.

Aizawl won their first title on the final day after securing a draw against Shillong Lajong on 30 April 2017. Defending champions Bengaluru FC finished in the fourth place. Dempo had entered the league after being promoted from the I-League 2nd Division but withdrew from the league along with Salgaocar and Sporting Goa. Aizawl were reinstated into the league after being relegated while Churchill Brothers, Chennai City, and Minerva Punjab were granted direct-entry into the I-League.

Teams

Ten teams are competing in the league. The majority of the teams from the previous season as well as recently promoted Dempo were originally supposed to compete this season. Dempo were promoted to the I-League on 30 May 2016, defeating Minerva Academy 3–1. Aizawl were relegated from the I-League the previous season, despite finishing above last place DSK Shivajians who were exempt from relegation. However, on 27 September 2016, the All India Football Federation (AIFF) announced that Aizawl would be reinstated into the I-League for the 2016–17 season.

Throughout the summer of 2016, the three Goan I-League clubs – Dempo, Salgaocar, and Sporting Goa – had been indecisive over their participation in the league. On 24 June 2016 it was first announced that Salgaocar and Sporting Goa would withdraw from the I-League following their displeasure over the proposed roadmap for Indian football for the 2017–18 season, with Dempo also threatening to do so next. However, in September 2015 it was revealed that despite withdrawing Sporting Goa and Dempo still submitted their AFC Licensing documents needed for I-League play. It was then revealed on 10 November that both Sporting Goa and Dempo were given national licenses for the I-League. Despite this though, however, on 22 November 2016 it was officially announced by Sporting Goa that they would withdraw from the I-League for good.

As well as dealing with the Goan clubs potential exit from the league, the AIFF have also worked on providing direct-entry for certain clubs into the I-League for this season. On 26 October 2016 it was revealed that both Minerva Academy and FC Bardez had submitted documents for direct-entry into the I-League. However, on 23 November, it was announced that the AIFF would be issuing new tenders for a direct-entry side in the league after none of the three sides which applied fulfilled the financial criteria.

On 8 December 2016, after Dempo confirmed their exit from the league, the AIFF reinstated Churchill Brothers into the I-League. Finally, on 11 December 2016, the AIFF granted direct-entry to both Chennai City and Minerva Punjab to bring the number of teams in the league to ten.

Stadiums and locations
Note: Table lists in alphabetical order.

Personnel and kits

Head coaching changes

Foreign players
A team can register up to four foreign players, of which one should compulsorily be a national of an Asian Country.

Results

League table

Results table

Season statistics

Top scorers

Top Indian scorers

Hat-tricks 

4  Player scored 4 goals.

Fair play
Churchill Brothers led the fair play table at the end of the season.

Attendance

Average home attendances

Highest attendances

Awards

Hero of the Match

Season awards
Hero I-League 2016–17 awards were voted by coaches and captains of the participating teams.

See also

 2016–17 I-League 2nd Division
 2016–17 Indian Women's League season
 2016–17 Aizawl F.C. season
 2016–17 Bengaluru FC season
 2016–17 Mohun Bagan A.C. season
 2016–17 East Bengal F.C. season
 2016–17 Mumbai F.C. season

References

External links
 

 
I-League seasons
Ind
1